David Lee may refer to:

Arts
 David Lee (Australian sound engineer) (born 1958)
 David Lee (Canadian sound engineer) (1938–2008)
 David Lee (art critic) (born 1953), editor of Jackdaw magazine
 David Lee (photographer) (born 1982), American photographer and film director
 David Lee (poet) (born 1944), American poet
 David Lee (screenwriter), American television writer, producer and director, notably of Frasier
 David Lee (still photographer) (born 1961)
 David M. Lee (stereophotographer) (1950–2015)
 David Dodd Lee (born 1959), American poet
 M. David Lee III (born 1965), American film director and producer
 David Lee (drummer) (1941–2021), American jazz drummer
 David Lee (visual effects artist), American visual effects artist

Sports
 David Lee (American football coach) (born 1953), American football coach and former player
 David Lee (Canadian football) (born 1990), Canadian football defensive end
 David Lee (athlete) (born 1959), American former hurdler
 David Lee (baseball) (born 1973), American Major League Baseball player (1999–2004)
 David Lee (basketball) (born 1983), American retired NBA basketball player
 Dave Lee (basketball) (David G. Lee, born 1942), American basketball player in the American Basketball Association
 David Lee (footballer, born 1967), English footballer who played mostly with Bury FC and Bolton Wanderers FC
 David Lee (footballer, born 1969), English footballer who played mostly with Chelsea FC
 David Lee (footballer, born 1980), English footballer who played mostly with Southend United FC and Hull City AFC
 David Lee (punter) (born 1943), American former Baltimore Colts punter
 David Lee (Singaporean footballer) (born 1958), Singaporean football player
 David Lee (sport shooter) (born 1948), Canadian sports shooter
 David Lee (volleyball) (born 1982), American Olympic volleyball player

Other
 David Lee (physicist) (born 1931), American Nobel Prize-winning physicist
 David Lee (politician) (born 1949), Republic of China politician
 David Lee (archdeacon of Bradford) (born 1948), Anglican Archdeacon of Bradford
 David Lee (archdeacon of Llandaff) (born 1930)
 David Lee (RAF officer) (1912–2004)
 David Lee (real estate developer), American head of Jamison Properties
 David Lee (investor), American angel investor
 David L. Lee (born 1950), Taiwanese-American managing general partner of Clarity Partners
 David S. Lee (born c. 1938), American CEO of eOn Communications Corporation
 David Lee (economist), economist and former provost of Princeton University
 David U. Lee, Chinese-American Hollywood film producer and entrepreneur
 David Lee, a fictional character in the television series The Good Wife and The Good Fight

See also
 Dave Lee (disambiguation)
 David Leigh (disambiguation)
 David Li (disambiguation)
 David Lea, Baron Lea of Crondall (born 1937), British Labour politician
 David Lee Murphy (born 1959), American singer
 Lee David (born 1994), South Korean actor